A  or  (pl. ) is an idiosyncratic taboo, whether of obligation or prohibition, similar to being under a vow or curse, yet the observance of which can also bring power and blessings. It is also used to mean specifically a spell prohibiting some action.  are common in Irish and Scottish folklore and mythology, as well as in modern English-language fantasy fiction.

The word originates in Old Irish, also known as Old Gaelic, and retains the same form in Modern Irish (nominative singular  , nom. plural  ; genitive sg. , gen. pl.  ). In modern Scottish Gaelic, the spelling has evolved in a slightly different direction (nom. sg. , nom. pl. , gen. sg.  or ).

In Irish mythology
A  can be compared with a curse, or paradoxically, a gift. If someone under a  violates the associated taboo, the infractor will suffer dishonor or even death.  Conversely, the observing of one's  is believed to bring power. Often, women place  upon men; in some cases, the woman turns out to be a goddess or other sovereignty figure.

The  is often a key device in hero tales, such as that of Cú Chulainn in Irish mythology. Traditionally, the doom of heroes comes about due to their violation of their , either by accident, or by having multiple , which then come into conflict. When a hag offers him dog meat, he has no way to emerge from the situation unscathed; this leads to his death.

In some cases, the placing of a  can lead to tragedy even when it is not violated.  imposed three  on Connla, her son with Cú Chulainn: he cannot turn back once he starts his journey; he must not refuse a challenge; and he must never tell anyone his name. She then sent Connla, aged seven, to seek out his father, but he was a child of such extraordinary skill that he was seen as a threat after having defeated all Ulster heroes who met him. Because of the  placed on him by his mother, he refuses to identify himself, which leads to his own father, Cú Chulainn, killing him in single combat using the Gáe Bulg before recognising too late who he was. He then introduces his dying son to the men of Ulster as a fitting hero.

A  might appear beneficial by involving a prophecy that a person would die in a particular way so bizarre that they could then avoid their fate for many years. Though he tries to rectify the situation by exiling them, his fate intervenes, so the remaining  are involuntarily and accidentally broken one after the other with a sense of gathering doom that cannot be checked.

In the Irish saga of Conchobar mac Nessa, the king is said to have the right to the first night with any marriageable woman and the right to sleep with the wife of anyone who hosted him. This is called the Geis of the king. Whether this right actually existed and was exercised by the Celts is not attested outside the sagas.

Welsh mythology
Considerable similarity exists between the Goidelic  and the Brythonic . This is not surprising given the close origins of many of the variants of Celtic mythology.

For example, the Welsh hero  (in one version of his story) was destined to die neither "during the day or night, nor indoors or outdoors, neither riding nor walking, not clothed and not naked, nor by any weapon lawfully made." He was safe until his wife, learning of these foretold conditions, convinced him to show her how he could theoretically be stepping out of a river onto a riverbank sheltered by a roof and put one foot on a goat, and so on, thus enabling the conditions that allowed him to be wounded.

Parallels in English literature
For example, in William Shakespeare's play Macbeth, the title character believes he is safe because "no man of woman born shall harm Macbeth". However, his nemesis Macduff was "from his mother's womb untimely ripp'd" (i.e., born by Caesarean section), and was therefore not "of woman born".

Another example is the Witch-King of Angmar from Tolkien's legendarium, who has a -like prophecy described by the Elven hero, Glorfindel: "Far off yet is his doom, and not by the hand of man shall he fall." In this the meaning is quite literal, for the Witch-king eventually falls at the hands of Éowyn and Meriadoc, one a shieldmaiden of Rohan, and thus not a man but a woman, and the other a hobbit, and thus not a Man as in species.

In popular culture
See the Geas/Geis section at Irish mythology in popular culture for examples.

References

Further reading
 Qiu Fangzhe, ‘Geis, a Literary Motif in Early Irish Literature’, St Anne's Academic Review, 2 (2010), 13–16

Irish mythology
Oaths
Magic (supernatural)